These are the official results of the Men's High Jump event at the 1995 IAAF World Championships in Gothenburg, Sweden. There were a total number of 35 participating athletes, with two qualifying groups and the final held on Tuesday August 8, 1995.

Schedule
All times are Central European Time (UTC+1)

Results

Qualifying round
Held on Sunday 1995-08-06

Qualification: Qualifying Performance 2.29 (Q) or at least 12 best performers (q) advance to the final.

Final

See also
 1993 Men's World Championships High Jump
 1994 Men's European Championships High Jump
 1996 Men's Olympic High Jump
 1997 Men's World Championships High Jump
 1998 Men's European Championships High Jump

References
 Results
 Detailed results

H
High jump at the World Athletics Championships